Pseudosphex variegata is a moth of the subfamily Arctiinae. It was described by William James Kaye in 1911.

References

Pseudosphex
Moths described in 1911